The siege of Rheinberg 1586–1590, also known as the capture of Rheinberg of 1590, took place at the strategic Cologne enclave of Rheinberg (present-day North Rhine-Westphalia, Germany), one of the principal crossing-points over the Rhine on the stretch between the Electorate of Cologne and the Dutch border, between 13 August 1586 and 3 February 1590, during the Eighty Years' War, the Cologne War, and the Anglo-Spanish War (1585–1604). After an initial siege in 1586, and a long blocking by the Spanish forces until September 1589, Don Alexander Farnese, Duke of Parma (Spanish: Alejandro Farnesio), commander-in-chief of the Spanish army, sent a substantial force, under Peter Ernst, Count of Mansfeld, to besiege Rheinberg. Despite the efforts by Maarten Schenck van Nydeggen (until his death at the Assault on Nijmegen on 10 August 1589), and Sir Francis Vere (from 1590), to relieve the fortress city, the Protestant garrison finally surrendered to the Spaniards on 3 February 1590.

On 19 August 1597 the Dutch army led by Maurice of Nassau captured Rheinberg for the States in his successful campaign of 1597, but the following year the Spanish Army of Flanders led by Don Francisco de Mendoza retook the strategic place, forcing the garrison to surrender.

See also
 Cologne War
 Army of Flanders
 Destruction of Neuss
 Assault on Nijmegen (1589)
 List of Archbishop-Electors of Cologne

Notes

References
 Hennes, Johann Heinrich. Der Kampf um das Erzstift Köln zur Zeit der Kurfürsten. Köln: DuMont-Schauberg. 1878. 
 Benians, Ernest Alfred, et al. The Cambridge Modern History. New York: MacMillan. 1905.
 Hamish Wilson, Peter. The Thirty Years War: Europe's Tragedy. First published 2009 by Penguin Group. 
 Brodek, Theodor V. Socio-Political Realities of the Holy Roman Empire. Journal of Interdisciplinary History. 1971.
 Luc Duerloo. Dynasty and Piety: Archduke Albert (1598–1621) and Habsburg Political Culture in an Age of Religious Wars. MPG Books Group. UK.
 Parker, Geoffrey. The Army of Flanders and the Spanish Road, 1567–1659. Cambridge: Cambridge University Press. 2004. 
 Juan Valera. Homenaje a Menéndez Pelayo. Estudios de Erudición Española. Madrid, 1899. 
 Jonathan I. Israel. Conflicts of Empires: Spain, the Low Countries and the Struggle for World Supremacy 1585–1713. London. 1997.

External links
 Conflicts of Empires: Spain, the Low Countries and the Struggle for World Supremacy 1585–1713

Rheinberg
Rheinberg
Rheinberg
Rheinberg
1590 in the Holy Roman Empire
Conflicts in 1586
Conflicts in 1587
Conflicts in 1588
Conflicts in 1589
Conflicts in 1590
1586 in the Holy Roman Empire
1587 in the Holy Roman Empire
1588 in the Holy Roman Empire
1589 in the Holy Roman Empire
16th-century military history of the Kingdom of England